Gravitcornutia cearae is a species of moth of the family Tortricidae. It is found in Ceará, Brazil.

The wingspan is 10 mm. The ground colour of the forewings is creamish, suffused with pale ferruginous. The markings are blackish, in some areas mixed with grey. The hindwings are grey.

Etymology
The species name refers to the state of Ceará.

References

Moths described in 2010
Gravitcornutia
Moths of South America
Taxa named by Józef Razowski